Xiangsha Liujun Wan  is a pale yellowish brown pill used in Traditional Chinese medicine to "replenish qi, invigorate the function of the spleen and regulate the function of the stomach". It is slightly aromatic and tastes pungent and slightly sweet. It is used when there are symptoms of "diminished function of the spleen with stagnation of qi marked by dyspepsia, belching, anorexia, epigastric and abdominal distension and loose bowels".

Chinese classic herbal formula

See also
 Chinese classic herbal formula
 Bu Zhong Yi Qi Wan

References

Traditional Chinese medicine pills